The plain-colored seedeater (Catamenia inornata) is a species of bird in the family Thraupidae.

It is found in Argentina, Bolivia, Chile, Colombia, Ecuador, Peru, and Venezuela. Its natural habitats are subtropical or tropical moist montane forests, subtropical or tropical high-altitude shrubland, and subtropical or tropical high-altitude grassland.

Gallery

References

plain-colored seedeater
Birds of the Andes
Birds of Argentina
plain-colored seedeater
Taxonomy articles created by Polbot